David Ranken  was consecrated a college bishop (i.e. a bishop without a diocese) on 11 June 1727.

References

College bishops